Madhu Malti is a coming-of-age 1978 Hindi film directed by Basu Bhattacharya. Produced by Chitra Katha, the film stars Sachin and Sarika in the title roles. This was Gulshan Grover's film debut. The film tells the love story of Madhu and Malti, two college students. The film was released on 25 August 1978 and was certified U by the Central Board of Film Certification.

Plot
Madhu (Sachin) and Malti (Sarika) are college students, who are assigned by their professor, Anil Sharma, to play the title parts in a college play based on Romeo and Juliet. The two fall in love along the way but are forced to move to a big city to realise their love, as their traditional families oppose to their relationship. The later move to Goa, where a Goan couple looks after them, but soon decide to go back home and confront the situation.

Cast 
The film's cast included:
Sachin as Madhu
Sarika as Malti
Nadira
Gulshan Grover
Dinesh Thakur
Arvind Deshpande
Manik Dutt
Bharat Bhushan
Sulabha Deshpande
Parveen Paul
Abha Dhulia
Benjamin Gilani
Prema Narayan
Jayadev Hattangadi

Soundtrack 
The film's soundtrack was composed by Ravindra Jain, and the playback singers included Mukesh, Hemlata, Suresh Wadkar. Jain also sang one of the songs, for the first time in his career.

Reception

References

External links 
 
 
 Madhu Malti at Bollywood Hungama

1978 films
1970s Hindi-language films